Back to Reality may refer to:

Back to Reality (TV series), a British reality television show featuring reality television stars from previous reality television programmes
Back to Reality (Slaughter album)
Back to Reality (Guanábanas album)
"Back to Reality" (song), a song by Tragedy Khadafi
"Back to Reality" (Red Dwarf), an episode of UK TV series Red Dwarf